Biyom is a Rai Coast language spoken in Madang Province, Papua New Guinea. It has 650 speakers.

References

Rai Coast languages
Languages of Madang Province